The  in Kōchi, Kōchi Prefecture, Japan belonged to the Yamauchi daimyō of Tosa Domain. The nagaya of 1864, 33.4m x 5.7m, twin storey, with a hip-and-gable tiled roof, is an Important Cultural Property.

See also

 Tosa Yamauchi Family Treasury and Archives
 Kōchi Castle

References

Buildings and structures in Kōchi Prefecture
Houses completed in 1866
Important Cultural Properties of Japan
1866 establishments in Japan
Kōchi